Munawar Iqbal Faruqui (born 28 January 1992) is an Indian stand-up comedian and rapper. In 2022 he appeared as a contestant on Kangana Ranaut's reality television show Lock Upp Season 1 and emerged as the winner of the show.

Early life
Faruqui was born in Junagadh, Gujarat, on 28 January 1992 to an Indian Muslim family. His family moved to Mumbai after his home was destroyed during the 2002 communal riots of Gujarat and his mother died soon after, when he was 16 year old.

At the age of 17, he was compelled to work for his family when his father fell sick. He worked at a utensil store while attending school.

In his early twenties, he worked as a graphic designer. In 2017, when various OTT platforms were introducing in India he became aware of comedy and he began working as a comedian.

Career
In April 2020, he uploaded a standup comedy video named "Dawood, Yamraaj & Aurat" on his channel, which earned him, his initial stardom. He released his debut song "Jawab" in collaboration with an Indian musician Spectra in August 2020.

In 28 Feb 2021, he uploaded a standup comedy video named "Ghost Story" on his YouTube Channel.

In 2022 he became a contestant on Kangana Ranaut's reality television show Lock Upp. On 8 May 2022 he was declared the show's winner.

Legal issues

2021 arrest
Faruqui was on his tour where he was performing comedy in different cities of India. On 1 January 2021, he performed a stand-up show at Munro Cafe in Indore, Madhya Pradesh, which was interrupted by Eklavya Singh Gaur, son of BJP MLA Malini Gaur accusing him of making malicious jokes about Hindu deities and the Minister of Home Affairs of India, Amit Shah. On 2 January, he was arrested by Madhya Pradesh Police in the midst of his comic act, stating that he was arrested under the Hate speech laws in India.  The police however, had no evidence against Munawar, still arrested him.

His arrest was heavily criticised for not respecting a comedian's freedom of speech, including by a joint initiative of the global Indian diaspora on 2 February 2021, that said a group of South Asian American stand-up comedians will perform a virtual comedy show on 6 February 2021 to show their solidarity with jailed Faruqui. He was subsequently granted bail by the Supreme Court of India.

He received marked criticism for his actions, which were seen by some as being insulting of the religious beliefs of Hindus.

Filmography

Television

Discography

References

External links

 
 

1992 births
Living people
Freedom of speech in India
Indian male comedians
Indian stand-up comedians
People from Mumbai
Indian comedians
People from Junagadh
Indian rappers
Gujarati Muslims
Indian theatre people
People from Gujarat
Gujarati people